Open Awards is a national Awarding Body and Access Validating Agency with headquarters in Liverpool. They are regulated by Ofqual and are an Access Validating Agency. They create and award educational and vocational qualifications from Entry Level to Level 4 (education), as well as Access to Higher Education Diplomas. They also offer unregulated units.

The company is registered with the Quality Assurance Agency, and with the Ofqual, the Office of Qualifications and Examinations Regulation. The awards are offered by schools, colleges, businesses and offender learning institutions across England.

Open Awards were previously known as Open College Network North West Region. An assessment from Warwick University indicated these awards were successful at widening participation

References

Qualification awarding bodies in the United Kingdom
Education companies of the United Kingdom